The Secret of the Black Falcon is a 1961 Italian swashbuckler film co-written and directed  by Domenico Paolella and starring Lex Barker and Livio Lorenzon.

Plot

Cast 
 
 Lex Barker as  Captain Don Carlos de Herrera
 Livio Lorenzon as Sergeant Rodriguez
  Nadia Marlowa  as Leonora
 Germano Longo as  Cat's Paw
 Walter Barnes as Calico Jack
  Pina Cornel as Yvette
 Loris Gizzi as Don Pedro Ordigaso
 Dina De Santis as Ines
 Tullio Altamura as Don Juan
 Gino Buzzanca as Gouvernator of Melida
 Ignazio Balsamo as Sancho 
 Corrado Annicelli as Don Alvaro Fontejuna

References

External links

 

1961 adventure films
Italian adventure films 
Italian swashbuckler films    
Films directed by Domenico Paolella
1960s Italian-language films
1960s Italian films